L'onorevole con l'amante sotto il letto is a 1981 commedia sexy all'italiana directed by Mariano Laurenti.

Plot    
Anna Vinci is a teacher in a private school in Milan. Due to some pupils, she comes into conflict with the principal of the school who fires her. To be summarized, he decides to go to Rome to visit the honorable Battistoni with whom he previously had a relationship. Due to a misunderstanding of the secretary Sgarbozzi, the teacher will be sent to the honorable's villa, from where he will try to hide her from his rigid wife.

Cast 
 Lino Banfi: On. Armando Battistoni 
 Janet Agren: Professor Anna Vinci
 Alvaro Vitali: Teo Mezzabotta
 Leo Gullotta: On. Sgarbozzi/sister of Sgarbozzi
 Teo Teocoli: Ferroviere
 Marisa Merlini: Virginia Battistoni
 Giacomo Furia: Cardinale Efisio
 Gigi Reder:  Monsignore 
 Lory del Santo: Cameriera casa Battistoni
 Jimmy il Fenomeno: Suor Consuelo
 Enzo Andronico: Major Pacetti

See also   
 List of Italian films of 1981

References

External links

1981 films
Commedia sexy all'italiana
Films directed by Mariano Laurenti
Adultery in films
Films set on trains
Films about politicians
1980s sex comedy films
Films scored by Gianni Ferrio
1981 comedy films
1980s Italian-language films
1980s Italian films